Exotica is the eighth studio album released by the British female vocal duo Bananarama. This is Bananarama's third album as a duo, and was produced by Pascal Caubet and issued only in France in 2001 on the M6 Interactions label. The work is a combination of new compositions along with re-recordings of past Bananarama hits, including a Latin pop version of the U.S. and UK Top 10 hit, "Cruel Summer".

Two promo-only singles were released from the album: "If" (which was abandoned mostly before release) and a cover version of George Michael's "Careless Whisper". The album was not a commercial or critical success for Bananarama, but the few copies of "If" which made it to the French market have become one of the rarest items ever by the band, heavily sought after by fans and collectors.

Track listing
France CD version
"If" — 3:52 (P. Caubet, S. Dallin, K. Woodward)
"Starz" — 3:45 (S. Dallin, T. Moran, Bassey Walker)
"What You Gonna Do" — 4:32 (S. Dallin, B. Walker)
"Cruel Summer" — 4:05 (S. Jolley, T. Swain, S. Dallin, S. Fahey, K. Woodward)
"Crazy" — 4:01 (S. Dallin, P. Hampartzyoumyan, K. Woodward)
"Boom" — 3:15 (S. Dallin, P. de Havilland, B. Walker)
"Robert De Niro's Waiting..." — 3:24 (S. Jolley, T. Swain, S. Dallin, S. Fahey, K. Woodward)
"Careless Whisper" — 4:02 (George Michael, Andrew Ridgeley)
"Sleep" — 4:06 (S. Dallin, P. Statham, B. Walker, K. Woodward)
"I Heard a Rumour" — 3:53 (S. Dallin, S. Fahey, K. Woodward, M. Stock, M. Aitken, P.  Waterman)
"Got a Thing for You" — 3:41 (P. Caubet, S. Dallin, B. Walker, K. Woodward)
"Venus" — 3:38 (R. V. Leeuwen)

Unreleased songs and demos
"You and I"
"You Are Not Me"
"U R My Baby" #:Available on the Disco Brothers CD album Disco Brothers Present Stars of the '80s.
"Your Love Tastes So Sweet"
"Breathe"
"Finally"
"Blue Sky"
"Middle of Nowhere"
"Waterloo" #:Available on the CDs A Song for Eurotrash and ABBA: A Tribute, The 25th Anniversary Celebration.
"I'm Waiting"
"I Like It"

Personnel
Bananarama
Sara Dallin - Vocals
Keren Woodward - Vocals

Produced by
Krysty Music Ltd.

Vocal arrangements
Sara Dallin on most songs
Keren Woodward on most songs
Bassey Walker on most songs

Recorded at
Krysty Music Studios, Paris
Pat Studio, Paris

Voices recorded at
Matrix Studios, London
North London Studios
Studio du Palais des Congres, Paris
Big Onion Studios, London

Guitars
Vasken Sayrin on "If", "Boom", "Careless Whisper" and "Got a Thing for You"
Alejandro Otero on "Cruel Summer"
Juan-Carlos Pellegrino on "Careless Whisper", "Sleep" and "Venus"

Keyboards
Pascal Caubet on most songs
Juan Carlos Pellegrino on "Cruel Summer"
Florent Enfer on "Robert De Niro's Waiting...", and "I Heard a Rumour"
Patrick Hampartzoumian on "Crazy"

Programming
Florent Enfer on most songs
Patrick Hampartzoumian on "Crazy"

Arrangements
Pascal Caubet and Florent Enfer on most songs
Bassey Walker and Peter de Havilland on "What You Gonna Do"
Patrick Hampartzoumian on "Crazy"

Executive producer
Pascal Caubet

Sound engineer
Juan Carlos Pellegrino

Mixed by
Juan Carlos Pellegrino and Pascal Caubet on most songs
Patrick Hampartzoumian on "Crazy"

Bananarama albums
2001 albums